Yusef Te'Jour Riley (born September 3, 1993) is a Bermudian basketball player for the Bermuda national basketball team.

Riley attended Cedarbridge Academy, where at age 14 he was spotted by Chris Crumpler, who became a coach and mentor. Riley then attended Metropolitan Preparatory Academy in Toronto and received the Political Science award when he graduated. In 2011, he received a $20,000 scholarship to study at McGill University. On December 31, 2012, Riley had a double-double of 10 points and 10 rebounds in a 78-63 overtime win against the University of Prince Edward Island. Riley played basketball at McGill from 2012 to 2013. Riley transferred to Paine College. On January 17, 2017, he was named the Southern Intercollegiate Athletic Conference player of the week after averaging 15 points and 6.5 rebounds per game. He also competed in track and field at Paine.

Yusef Riley is one of the country's top players. In 2018, he recorded most rebounds (10.4 per game) and blocks (2.0 per game) for Bermuda, in addition to 14.6 points and 2.8 assists per game. Before he joined the senior national team, he had been a member of the country's Under-18 national team.

References

External links
Paine Lions bio

1993 births
Living people
Small forwards
Bermudian men's basketball players
People from Devonshire Parish
McGill Redmen basketball players
Paine College alumni